The Rhineland Offensive was a series of allied offensive operations by 21st Army Group commanded by Bernard Montgomery from 8 February 1945 to 25 March 1945, at the end of the Second World War. The operations were aimed at occupying the Rhineland and securing a passage over the Rhine river. 

It was part of General Dwight D. Eisenhower's "broad front" strategy to occupy the entire west bank of the Rhine before its crossing. The Rhineland Offensive encompassed Operation Veritable, Operation Grenade, Operation Blockbuster, Operation Plunder and Operation Varsity.

See also
 Allied advance from Paris to the Rhine

Notes

Further reading

 Berkel, Alexander (2004). Krieg vor der Eigenen Haustür, Kleef, B.o.s.s. Druck und Medien. .
 Hag, Leo ten (2014). Het natuurgebied rondom Nijmegen bezien als militair landschap3. .
 Rawson, A. (2006). The Rhine Crossing. 9th US Army & 17th US Airborne, South Yorkshire, Pen & Sword Military. .
 Rosendaal, J. (2014). De Bevrijding in Beeld. Van Neerpelt tot Wesel, 1944–1945, Nijmegen, Vantilt. .
 Saunders, Tim (2006). Operation Plunder. The British & Canadian Rhine Crossing, South Yorkshire, Pen & Sword Military. .
 Whitaker, W.D. en Whitaker, S. (1989). Rhineland. The Battle to end the war., Stoddart. .

External links
 The Start Of The Rhineland Offensive, legionmagazine.com

Western European Campaign (1944–1945)
Rhine Province
February 1945 events in Europe
1945 in military history
1945 in Germany